The  is a professional golf tournament on the Japan Golf Tour. Founded in 1969, the event has been hosted at different courses throughout Japan, including on all four major islands. In 2022, the purse was ¥100,000,000, with ¥20,000,000 going to the winner. From 2014 to 2019 the tournament was co-sanctioned by the Asian Tour.

Winners

Notes

References

External links
Coverage on Japan Golf Tour's official site
Coverage on Asian Tour's official site
Tournament's site 

Golf tournaments in Japan
Japan Golf Tour events
Former Asian Tour events
Recurring sporting events established in 1969